François Laroche, born on 5 January 1775 at Ruffec (Charente), was a French general of the Revolutionary and the Napoleonic wars.

Biography

He joined the military as a lieutenant of the grenadier battalion of the Charente volunteers on 1 December 1791. During the years 1792–1793, he served in the armies of the North and Sambre and Meuse.  Promoted to lieutenant on 1 April 1793, and to captain on 12 February.  At the Arlon, he led a vigorous charge against an Austrian cavalry regiment, taking two guns and forced the Austrians into a complete rout. After 5 January 1798, he resumed his duties in the infantry in the same regiment on 20 April 1799 in the Army of the Danube. In 1800 he campaigned with the Army of the Rhine.

In 1803, he joined the Imperial Guard as a captain of the horse grenadiers. As such, he participated in  Battle of Austerlitz.  There, he served in Michel Ordener's regiment as captain of the second squadron, second company.  As a result of this battle, the colonel of the First Carabiniers was promoted to General, and Napoleon appointed his brother in law, Prince Camille Borghèse as its new chef.  The Prince had no experience, having served only as a squadron leader in the mounted grenadiers of the Imperial Guard; Laroche was assigned to assist him in this new position.  The Prince's preoccupation as a courtier, rather than soldier, left Laroche, now a major, in virtual command.  Borghese's continued dereliction—he had not even been at the head of his unit during Napoleon's inspection at Elbing on 8 May 1807—resulted in the prince's promotion to general and Laroche's assignment to head the command, including a promotion to colonel.

The First Carabiniers were not present at Eylau, having been ordered late to follow the main body of the French Army, and then being ordered to hold a few miles away from the battlefield itself. The French casualties there were great, almost impossible to estimate.  The regiment later marched past the frozen corpses of horses and men on the battle field. They caught up with the rest of the French Army in time to participate at Heilsberg, and later at Friedland.  He was wounded by a sword blow to the head in combat at Ratisbon on 23 April 1809; subsequently, on 6 July, at the Battle of Wagram, commanding 1st Carabinier Regiment of Bessières's cavalry reserve, his horse was killed under him.

He served in 1812 in French invasion of Russia, and in the campaign in Saxony in 1813. He was appointed brigadier general on September 28 of that year; in October, he commanded a brigade in Hanau, And after the abdication of the Emperor, the Restored Bourbons gave him command of the Department of Charente on 23 July 1814.  He entered inactive duty on 1 February 1816, and retired on April 1, 1820 . General Laroche died in Ruffec (Charente) on 22 February 1823.

Honors
Officer of the Legion of Honor on 14 March 1806.
Baron of the Empire.
Knight of Order of Saint Louis on 29 July 1814.

Notes and citations

Notes

Citations

French Republican military leaders of the French Revolutionary Wars
French commanders of the Napoleonic Wars
1775 births
1823 deaths
People from Charente